Bicycle clips may refer to:

 Bicycle clip hat, a style of small hat that is held in place by a metal clip
 Trouser clips, small C-shaped pieces of thin metal worn around the ankle when cycling in trousers
 Pedal clips, an attachment that is shaped like the toe of a shoe that prevents a cyclist's shoe from slipping off the pedal